The National Sports Committee of Indonesia (abbreviated KONI) is the sports governing body of Indonesia. It was founded in 1946 to unite the various satellite sports associations that was created within the regions of Indonesia. KONI is responsible on sport development as well as organising sporting events within Indonesian national boundary on national level. It organizes the Pekan Olahraga Nasional (PON), multi-sport event held every four years where Indonesian athletes compete. It is the largest sporting event in Indonesia.

In 2005, KOI (Komite Olimpiade Indonesia or Indonesian Olympic Committee) was formed as a separate entity from KONI. KOI is responsible as Indonesian National Olympic Committee, to organise Indonesian participation in international sporting events, such as Olympic Games, Asian Games, Southeast Asian Games, etc. The KONI-KOI separation was based according to Act No. 3 of 2005 on National Sport System, and further enforced with Government Regulation No. 17 of 2007 about the organizing of sporting events.

References

Indonesia
Sport in Indonesia
Indonesia at the Olympics
1946 establishments in Indonesia
Sports
Sports organizations established in 1946